College list of Kalyani university

List
Asannagar Madan Mohan Tarkalankar College
Berhampore College
Berhampore Girls' College
Bethuadahari College
Chakdaha College
Chapra Bangaljhi Mahavidyalaya
Chapra Government College
Domkal Girl's College
Dr. B.R. Ambedkar College
Dukhulal Nibaran Chandra College
Dumkal College
Dwijendralal College
G.D.College
Haringhata Mahavidyalaya
Hazi A.K. Khan College
Jalangi Mahavidyalaya
Jangipur College
Jatindra Rajendra Mahavidyalaya
Kaliganj Government College
Kalyani Mahavidyalaya
Kanchrapara College
Kandi Raj College
Karimpur Pannadevi College
Krishnagar Government College 
Krishnagar Women's College
Krishnath College
Lalgola College
Muragacha Government College
Murshidabad Adarsha Mahavidyalaya
Muzaffar Ahmed Mahavidyalaya
Nabadwip Vidyasagar College
Nabagram Amar Chand Kundu College
Nagar College
Nur Mohammad Smriti Mahavidyalaya
Panchthupi Haripada Gouribala College
Plassey College
Pritilata Mahila Mahavidyalaya
Prof. Sayed Nurul Hasan College
Raja Birendra Chandra College
Ranaghat College
Rani Dhanya Kumari College
Sagardighi Kamada Kinkar Smriti Mahavidyalaya
Santipur College
Srikrishna College
Sripat Singh College
Sewnarayan Rameswar Fatepuria College
Subhas Chandra Bose Centenary College
Sudhiranjan Lahiri Mahavidyalaya 
Tehatta Government College
Tagore School of Rural Development and Agriculture Management

Law colleges
Snehangshu Kanta Acharya Institute of Law
Bimal Chandra College of Law
J.R.S.E.T. College of Law
Mohammad Abdul Bari Institute of Juridical Science

References 

Colleges
Kalyani
Lists of universities and colleges in West Bengal